The Eukaryotic Pathgen Database, or EuPathDB, is a database of bioinformatic and experimental data related to a variety of eukaryotic pathogens. It was established in 2006 under a National Institutes of Health program to create Bioinformatics Resource Centers to facilitate research on pathogens that may pose biodefense threats. EuPathDB stores data related to its organisms of interest and provides tools for searching through and analyzing the data. It currently consists of 14 component databases, each dedicated to a certain research topic.
EuPathDB includes:
 Genomics resources covering eukaryotic protozoan parasites
 Host responses to parasite infection (HostDB)
 Orthologs (OrthoMCL)
 Clinical study data (ClinEpiDB)
 Microbiome data (MicrobiomeDB)

History
EuPathDB was established under the NIH Bioinformatics Resource Centers program as ApiDB, a resource meant to cover Apicomplexan parasites. ApiDB originally consisted of component sites CryptoDB (for Cryptosporidium), PlasmoDB (for Plasmodium), and ToxoDB (for Toxoplasma gondii). As ApiDB grew to focus on eukaryotic pathogens beyond Apicomplexans, the name was changed to EuPathDB to support its broadened scope. EuPathDB was the result of collaboration between many different parasitologists, including David Roos, Jessica Kissinger and Dyann Wirth.

Functions
It is an integrated database covering the eukaryotic pathogens in several genera. It enables the accessing of detailed genome information associated with these pathogens. EuPathDB was formerly known as ApiDB and was the integrated resources for the apicomplexans covering the databases of associated pathogens, ToxoDB, PiroplasmDB and CryptoDB.

Presently EuPathDB covers 11 databases, the latest addition being that of Piroplasma which supports Babesia and Theileria. This BRC is one of five centres being funded to provide
support to research bodies. EuPath supports the investigation of eukaryotic pathogens, and the other four centres support the investigation of other disease pathogens. It has developed a sophisticated search system providing invaluable help to researchers.

Component databases
EuPathDB consists of 14 component databases, each with a particular focus:
 AmoebaDB (Pathogenic amoeba)
 CryptoDB (Cryptosporidium species)
 FungiDB (Pathogenic fungi)
 GiardiaDB (Giardia species)
 MicrosporidiaDB (Microsporidia species)
 PiroplasmaDB (Pathogenic Piroplasmida)
 PlasmoDB (Plasmodium species)
 ToxoDB (Toxoplasma gondii)
 TrichDB (Trichomonas species)
 TriTrypDB (Kinetoplastida such as Leishmania and Trypanosoma species)
 HostDB (host response to parasite infection)
 OrthoMCL (for orthologous protein sequences)
 ClinEpiDB (for clinical study data)
 MicrobiomeDB (for microbiome data)

References

Bioinformatics organizations
Genome databases
Pathogen genomics